Maris Soule (born June 19, 1939) is an American author of romance and romantic suspense novels, mysteries, and short stories. Her latest book, Eat Crow and Die, is a mystery novel. Her books feature a variety of settings and situations, including the Iditarod Trail Sled Dog Race, Search and Rescue dogs, barrel racing, dressage, and a Rhodesian Ridgeback puppy.

Biography
Maris Soule was born in Oakland, California. She  graduated from U.C. Davis with a B.A. After receiving a Lifetime Teaching Credential from U.C. Berkeley, she taught art and math at Rio Americano High School, Carmichael, California, La Cumbre Junior High School, Santa Barbara, California, and Galesburg-Augusta High School, Galesburg, Michigan. She married in 1968, and she and her husband moved to Michigan in 1970.

Recognition and awards
Several of her books have been finalists or winners of awards from the Romance Writers of America and the Wisconsin Romance Writers of America.
 Finalist for RWA's 1988 RITA Award (known then as the Golden Medallion Award) for A Winning Combination
 First Place, Short Contemporary, WisRWA Write Touch: Readers' Choice Award 
 First Place, Traditional Category, WisRWA Write Touch: Readers' Choice Award for Substitute Mom
 Second Place, 1998 Kiss of Death contest for Shelter from the Storm
 Finalist for 1999 RITA Award and 3rd in Kiss of Death contest for Chase the Dream
 Winner of 2017 Mystery/Thriller division of the Florida Writers Associations Royal Palm Literary Award for "Echoes of Terror."

Bibliography
Echoes of Terror (2017)
A Killer Past (2015)
Eat Crow and Die (2015)
As the Crow Flies (2011)
The Crows (2008)
Paternity Lessons (1999)
The Bachelor, the Beauty and the Blizzard (1998)
Chase the Dream (1998)
Shelter from the Storm (1997)
Heiress Seeking Perfect Husband (1997)
Destiny Unknown (1997)
Destiny Strikes Twice (1996)
Substitute Mom (1996)
Thrill of the Chase (1995)
Dark Temptation (1995)
Stop the Wedding (1994)
No Promises Made (1994)
No Strings Attached (1993)
Con Man (1993)
Lyon's Pride (1993)
Missy's Proposition (1992)
Jared's Lady (1991)
Storybook Hero (1989)
The Law of Nature (1988)
The Best of Everything (1988)
A Winning Combination (1987)
Sounds Like Love (1986)
Lost and Found (1985)
First Impressions (1983)

External links
 Maris Soule's website
  Extract from The Crows
Maris Soule at Fantastic Fiction

1939 births
20th-century American novelists
Living people
21st-century American novelists
American women novelists
21st-century American women writers
20th-century American women writers
University of California, Davis alumni
People from Oakland, California
Novelists from California